

X-4 pilots

X-4 flights

See also
X-4 Bantam
Chuck Yeager
Scott Crossfield
John McKay
Joseph Walker

Flight lists